Camp Qargha, was an Afghan National Army facility which was home to its Officer Academy. The Afghan Army was supported by mentors from the United Kingdom, Australia, New Zealand and Denmark. The facility was located in Kabul, about six miles from the Hamid Karzai International Airport (HKIA).

Units
 Combined Joint Task Force Phoenix / 33rd Infantry Brigade Combat Team during February 2009
 2nd Battalion, 130th Infantry Regiment during February 2009
 2nd Battalion The Royal Regiment of Scotland (2015-16)
 Quebec Company, 2nd Battalion, Yorkshire Regiment (2018)

 6th Royal Australian Regiment (2018-19)
 Australian Mentoring Team
 Afghan Garrison Support Unit

References

External links
Camp Phoenix
History of Kabul and description of current situation
Webpage for CJTF Phoenix VII
Webpage for 27th BCT of the New York National Guard as CJTF Phoenix VII
Webpage for 218th of South Carolina National Guard as CJTF Phoenix VI

Military installations of the United States in Afghanistan